Otto Schlaginhaufen (November 8, 1879 in St. Gallen – November 14, 1973 in Kilchberg) was a Swiss anthropologist,  ethnologist and eugenicist.

References

1879 births
1973 deaths
Swiss ethnologists
Swiss eugenicists
People from St. Gallen (city)